Holborn Viaduct is a road bridge in London and the name of the street which crosses it (which forms part of the A40 route). It links Holborn, via Holborn Circus, with Newgate Street, in the City of London financial district, passing over Farringdon Street and the subterranean River Fleet. City surveyor William Haywood was the architect and the engineer was Rowland Mason Ordish.

History
Holborn Viaduct was built between 1863 and 1869, as a part of the Holborn Valley Improvements, which included a public works scheme which, at a cost of over £2.5 million (over £ in ), improved access into the City from the West End, with better traffic flow and distribution around the new Holborn Circus, the creation of Queen Victoria Street, the rebuilding of Blackfriars Bridge, the opening of the Embankment section into the City, the continuation of Farringdon Street  as Farringdon Road and associated railway routes with Farringdon station and Ludgate Hill station. It was opened by Queen Victoria at the same time as the inauguration of the other thoroughfares with a formal coach drive procession on 6 November 1869.

The viaduct effected a more level approach on the crossing of this section of the Holborn/Fleet valley from east to west, across Farringdon Street. Previously this involved horse-drawn traffic having to descend from High Holborn along Charterhouse Street to the smaller Holborn Bridge, crossing the River Fleet which had been culverted between Ludgate Circus to this crossing in 1734 to ascend to the other side using Snow Hill; it was one of the first modern flyovers in central London.

Pedestrian access between the two street levels was effected via four pavilions, at each side and either end, containing staircases for access from the viaduct to Farringdon Street below; with their parapets adorned with figurative statues to represent commerce and agriculture on the south side, both by sculptor Henry Bursill, with science and fine art on the north side, by the sculpture firm Farmer & Brindley; there are also statues of lord mayors William Walworth and Henry Fitz-Ailwin. In 1941 the Blitz raids destroyed and damaged most of the area including the north side pavilions; these were copied and reinstated with associated property developments in 2000 (western) and 2014 (eastern), including lifts.

Holborn Viaduct railway station, opened on 2 March 1874, was at the eastern end with a low-level through route towards Farringdon, and was replaced in 1990 by St. Paul's Thameslink railway station (later renamed City Thameslink).

In 1882, 57 Holborn Viaduct, on the north-eastern side, became home to the world's first coal-fired power station, the Edison Electric Light Station, operational from 1882 to 1886.  The building in which it was housed was destroyed by bombing during the Blitz, and the large building called 60 Holborn Viaduct has since subsumed the site.

See also

List of bridges in London

References

 
 

Streets in the City of London
Bridges in the City of London
Viaducts in England
Buildings and structures in Holborn
Grade II listed buildings in the City of London
Grade II listed bridges in London